Milan Janošević (Serbian Cyrillic: Милан Јаношевић; born April 3, 1980) is a Serbian former footballer who played in the First League of FR Yugoslavia, Úrvalsdeild, and Canadian Soccer League.

Playing career 
Janošević began his career in 2001 with FK Zeta in the First League of FR Yugoslavia, and had a stint with FK Bane. In 2005, he went abroad to Iceland to play in the Úrvalsdeild with Knattspyrnudeild Keflavík. In 2006, he signed with the Serbian White Eagles FC of the Canadian Soccer League. In his debut season he won the International Division title, and featured in the CSL Championship final against Italia Shooters. He claimed his first championship in 2008 against Trois-Rivières Attak. During his tenure with Serbia he won 3 division titles, and 1 championship.

Honours

Serbian White Eagles 
CSL Championship (1): 2008
Canadian Soccer League International Division (3): 2006, 2007, 2009

References 

1980 births
Living people
People from Raška, Serbia
Serbian footballers
FK Zeta players
FK Bane players
Knattspyrnudeild Keflavík players
Serbian White Eagles FC players
First League of Serbia and Montenegro players
Úrvalsdeild karla (football) players
Canadian Soccer League (1998–present) players
Expatriate soccer players in Canada
Association football midfielders